David Mauricio Rivera (born September 16, 1965) is an American Republican politician from Florida. He was a member of the U.S. House of Representatives for one term, representing parts of South Florida from 2011 to 2013.

Rivera was arrested on December 5, 2022 and charged with failure to register as a foreign agent and money laundering conspiracy.

Early life, education, and early career
Rivera was born in New York City on September 16, 1965 and moved to Florida in 1974. Both his father, a cab driver, and his mother Daisy, a driving instructor, had fled Cuba after the political rise of Fidel Castro. He graduated from Miami Christian High School. He earned his Bachelor of Arts degree with honors in Political Science from Florida International University in 1986 and his MPA in 1994.

After college, Rivera worked as Public Affairs Director for the Washington D.C.-based Valladares Foundation, an international human rights NGO. The organization was founded by U.S. Ambassador Armando Valladares, the former U.S. Ambassador to the United Nations Human Rights Commission. Then, he worked for the Office of Cuba Broadcasting managed by auspices of the U.S. State Department. He has also been an adjunct professor in the FIU School of Policy and Management. His articles on U.S.-Cuba relations have been published in The Miami Herald and El Nuevo Herald.

Florida House of Representatives
In 2002, he ran for Florida's 112th state house district. He defeated Ray Gonzalez in the Republican primary, 52–48%. He won the general election unopposed. He won re-election unopposed in 2004, 2006, and 2008.

In the Florida House, Rivera chaired the rules committee before serving as chairman of the appropriations committee from 2009 to 2010, where he pushed to create new professional schools at FIU and helped the Miami-Dade delegation work within a tight state budget. “We are all geared toward finding cost savings,” he explained to the Herald. Alongside his support for tax-free back-to-school shopping holidays, Rivera sponsored a measure forbidding places of higher education in Florida from sponsoring and paying for research trips to Cuba. And it was Cuba, perhaps more than any other issue that emerged as Rivera’s main issue concern in Tallahassee: “It’s the most important issue to me,” he said in the winter of 2004. “I think every Cuban American from whatever walk of life has a moral obligation to continue the cause of a free and Democratic Cuba.

In addition to his legislative office, he has served the Republican Party as State Committeeman for the Republican Party of Florida and as the Executive Director for the Republican Party of Miami-Dade County.

U.S. House of Representatives

Elections
2010

In January 2009, Rivera filed to run for the state senate seat being vacated by J. Alex Villalobos.
However, when neighboring U.S. Congressman Lincoln Díaz-Balart decided not to run for another term in 2010, his brother, U.S. Congressman Mario Díaz-Balart, opted to run for a new term in Lincoln's district rather than his current one. This created an opening in the seat and prompted Rivera to announce he would run for Florida's 25th congressional district on February 25, 2010. On August 24, he won the Republican primary with 63% of the vote. On November 2, Rivera defeated Democratic nominee Joe Garcia 52%–43%.

2012

Redistricting resulted in Rivera's district being renumbered as the 26th district. It lost its share of Collier County and picked up the Florida Keys, as well as portions of Miami-Dade County. While the old 25th leaned Republican, the new 26th is more of a swing district and is equally split between Democrats and Republicans. In a rematch from 2010, Garcia defeated Rivera 54%–43%.

Committee assignments
 Committee on Foreign Affairs
 Subcommittee on Oversight and Investigations
 Subcommittee on the Western Hemisphere
 Committee on Natural Resources
 Subcommittee on Energy and Mineral Resources
 Subcommittee on National Parks, Forests and Public Lands

Later career 
In May 2014, Rivera announced he would run for Congress again. He was defeated in the Republican primary, coming in fourth place with 7.5% of the vote.

In March 2016, Rivera announced he would run for the open state house district 118, but lost to Democrat Robert Asencio by 53 votes. In March 2017, Rivera announced he would run for the state house again in 2018, this time in neighboring district 105.

In April 2012, Rivera initiated a scheme to secretly fund candidate Justin Lamar Sternad in the Democratic primary as a way to weaken his eventual 2012 general election opponent, Joe Garcia, when he met with his associate, Miami campaign consultant Ana Sol Alliegro, and directed her to approach Sternad with an offer to provide financial support to his primary campaign. At Rivera’s direction, Alliegro spent the next few months acting as an intermediary, transmitting funds to Sternad, the Sternad political action committee, and vendors providing services to Sternad’s committee. Rivera funneled nearly $76,000 to the Democratic ringer candidate.

The Federal Election Commission (FEC) accused Rivera of illegally making contributions in the name of another person when he made multiple cash payments to third-party vendors providing services to the Sternad campaign from July 14, 2012 to August 8, 2012. Rivera also took steps to hide his identity and directed others not to disclose him as the true source of those cash payments, the FEC complaint stated. Rivera's activity was also the subject of an investigation by the U.S. Attorney’s Office of Southern Florida. Sternad and Alliegro pleaded guilty to criminal charges for their roles in the scheme.

On March 24, 2022, a federal judge ruled against his appeal of the $456,000 judgment against him tied to his federal elections campaign violations. It was one of the 15 largest fines ever handed down by the FEC.

On December 5, 2022, Rivera was arrested and charged with conspiracy to launder money and with failing to register as a foreign agent, the latter a violation of the Foreign Agents Registration Act (FARA). He was allegedly a lobbyist for Venezuela, promoting the normalization of relations between that country and the United States. Rivera was arrested in Atlanta, Georgia, and is currently out on bail.

See also
 List of Hispanic and Latino Americans in the United States Congress
 List of federal political scandals in the United States

References

External links
 David Rivera for State Representative District 118 official campaign site
 
 

|-

1965 births
21st-century American politicians
American politicians of Cuban descent
Florida International University alumni
Hispanic and Latino American members of the United States Congress
Hispanic and Latino American state legislators in Florida
Latino conservatism in the United States
Living people
Republican Party members of the Florida House of Representatives
Politicians from Miami
Politicians from New York City
Republican Party members of the United States House of Representatives from Florida